{{Taxobox
| name = Wattieza
| image = Eospermatopteris erianus.jpg
| image_caption = W. givetiana
| fossil_range = Middle Devonian
| regnum = Plantae
| divisio = Pteridophyta
| classis = †Cladoxylopsida
| ordo = †Pseudosporochnales
| genus = Wattieza| genus_authority = Stockmans
| subdivision_ranks = Species
| subdivision =
 
}}Wattieza was a genus of prehistoric trees that existed in the mid-Devonian that belong to the cladoxylopsids, close relatives of the modern ferns and horsetails. The 2005 (publicly revealed in 2007) discovery in Schoharie County, New York, of fossils from the Middle Devonian about 385 million years ago united the crown of Wattieza to a root and trunk known since 1870. The fossilized grove of "Gilboa stumps" discovered at Gilboa, New York, were described as Eospermatopteris, though the complete plant remained unknown. These fossils have been described as the earliest known trees, standing 8 m (26 ft) or more tall, resembling the unrelated modern tree fern.Wattieza had fronds rather than leaves, and they reproduced with spores.

Belgian paleobotanist François Stockmans described Wattieza givetiana in 1968 from fossil fronds collected from Middle Devonian strata in the London-Brabant Massif in Belgium.

English geologist and palaeobotanist Chris Berry described Wattieza casasii'' in 2000 from fossil branches collected from Middle Devonian strata—green mudstones and shales close to the base of the Campo Chico Formation, Givetian—in Cano Colorado, Perija Range, Venezuela.

References

Paleobiology Database accessed 19 April 2007
"Oldest tree had fronds, not leaves". Article on CNN.com
(Cosmos) Michelle Carr, "Wattieza is world's oldest tree"  19 April 2007
 

Middle Devonian plants